S. N. M. Ubayadullah (16 June 1941 – 19 February 2023) was an Indian politician and minister for commercial taxes in Tamil Nadu. He was born in Abiramam and had finished his PUC education. Later, he moved to Thanjavur district, where he was elected by the Thanjavur constituency as a Dravida Munnetra Kazhagam (DMK) candidate in the 1989, 1996, 2001, and 2006 elections.

Ubayadullah died on 19 February 2023, at the age of 81.

References 

1941 births
2023 deaths
Dravida Munnetra Kazhagam politicians
State cabinet ministers of Tamil Nadu
Tamil Nadu MLAs 1996–2001
Tamil Nadu MLAs 2001–2006
Tamil Nadu MLAs 2006–2011
People from Ramanathapuram district